4, 5 and 6 is a studio album by saxophonist Jackie McLean recorded for Prestige Records. It was recorded in 1956 and originally released that year as PRLP 7048. In 1962, the album was reissued under the same title on the Prestige sub-label New Jazz Records as NJ 8279 with a different cover. The album was reissued on CD in 1991. It features McLean in a quartet with pianist Mal Waldron, bassist Doug Watkins and drummer Art Taylor. Trumpeter Donald Byrd guests on three tracks, and tenor saxophonist Hank Mobley on one.

Track listing

Recorded on July 13 (#1–3) and 20 (#4–6), 1956.

Personnel
Jackie McLean – alto sax
Hank Mobley – tenor sax (#4 only)
Donald Byrd – trumpet (#3, 4, 6 only)
Mal Waldron – piano
Doug Watkins – bass
Art Taylor – drums

References

1956 albums
Jackie McLean albums
Albums produced by Bob Weinstock
Prestige Records albums
Albums recorded at Van Gelder Studio